The Milwaukee Law School, founded in 1892 as the Milwaukee Law Class, was a law school in Milwaukee, Wisconsin which originated as a student-owned cooperative with two volunteer instructors. It later added additional professors, and in 1896 changed its name to Milwaukee Law School. It operated as a night school, holding classes in rented spaces in downtown Milwaukee. In 1908 it was acquired, along with Milwaukee University Law School, to become the core of Marquette University Law School.

Notable alumni 
Max E. Binner, member of the Wisconsin State Assembly
Oscar M. Fritz, chief justice of the Wisconsin Supreme Court
Peter F. Leuch, member of the Wisconsin State Assembly
William L. Richards, member of the Wisconsin State Senate
Lawrence J. Timmerman, member of the Wisconsin State Assembly (graduated after the merger into MULS)
George Weissleder, member of the Wisconsin State Senate

References

 
Educational institutions established in 1892
Educational institutions disestablished in 1908
Law schools in Wisconsin
Marquette University
Universities and colleges in Milwaukee
1892 establishments in Wisconsin
1900s disestablishments in Wisconsin
Defunct law schools